Étienne Alain Djissikadié (born 5 January 1977) is a Gabonese former professional footballer who played as an attacking midfielder. He played for the Gabon national team.

Club career 
01/2014 – ?: CF Mounana
07/2010 – 12/2013: US Bitam
01/2008 – 06/2010: TP Mazembe
06/2007 – 12/2007: AS Stade Mandji Port-Gentil
01/2004 – 06/2007: Sogéa FC
01/2003 – 12/2003: Mangasport Moanda
01/1996 – 12/1997: Mbilinga FC

International career 
Djissikadie was a regular member of Gabon national team squads. He played from 1997 until 2014 in 47 FIFA matched and scored two goals.

References

1977 births
Living people
People from Haut-Ogooué Province
Gabonese footballers
Association football midfielders
Gabon international footballers
Gabon A' international footballers
2010 Africa Cup of Nations players
2011 African Nations Championship players
2014 African Nations Championship players
AS Stade Mandji players
Mbilinga FC players
Gabonese expatriate footballers
Gabonese expatriate sportspeople in the Democratic Republic of the Congo
Expatriate footballers in the Democratic Republic of the Congo
21st-century Gabonese people